Midnighters is a 2017 American neo-noir thriller film directed by Julius Ramsay. It stars Alexandra Essoe, Perla Haney-Jardine, Dylan McTee, Ward Horton, Andrew Rothenberg and Joseph Lee Anderson.

The film had its world premiere at the LA Film Festival on June 19, 2017. The film was released on March 2, 2018.

Plot
Midnight, New Year's Eve: when all the hopes of new beginnings come to life - except for Lindsey and Jeff Pittman, whose strained marriage faces the ultimate test after they cover up a terrible crime and find themselves entangled in a Hitchcockian web of deceit and madness.

Cast
Alexandra Essoe as Lindsey
Perla Haney-Jardine as Hannah
Dylan McTee as Jeff	
Ward Horton as Smith	
Andrew Rothenberg as Officer Verone	
Joseph Lee Anderson as Officer Campbell
K.C. Faldasz as Vic
William Bloomfield as Hotel Attendant
David Spadora as Mike

Reception
On review aggregator website Rotten Tomatoes, the film holds an approval rating of 81% based on 32 reviews, and an average rating of 6.18/10. The website's critical consensus reads, "Adding dashes of horror to a noir premise, Midnighters is a genre-bending chiller that delights as often as it scares." On Metacritic, the film has a weighted average score of 63 out of 100, based on 7 critics, indicating "generally favorable reviews".

References

External links 

2017 films
2017 thriller films
American thriller films
Films shot in Rhode Island
Holiday horror films
Films set around New Year
2010s English-language films
2010s American films